Stephen E. Murphy (born 1957) is an American retired federal agent of the U.S. Drug Enforcement Administration (DEA) who, along with Javier Peña, was one of the lead investigators in the manhunt of Colombian drug lord and leader of the Medellín Cartel, Pablo Escobar.

Biography
Murphy grew up in Princeton, West Virginia where he graduated from Princeton High School in 1974 and attended West Virginia University for a year. He served as a Police Officer in the City of Bluefield, West Virginia from 1975 to 1977. He transferred to Bluefield State College, from which he graduated with a bachelor's degree in Criminal Justice in 1981. He joined the DEA in 1987 and started working in Miami, where he stayed for four years, before being transferred to Bogotá, Colombia. 

He played an important role in the killing of Escobar, and was first on the scene with a working camera when Pablo Escobar was shot dead on a Medellín roof. A photograph of Murphy holding the body of Escobar is widely known, with Murphy claiming he was "caught up in the moment". After Escobar's death, in December 1993, he returned to the United States, where he continued to work with the DEA until his retirement in July 2013. Today he heads a law-enforcement private consulting firm and travels around the world giving speeches and telling the true story of Pablo Escobar alongside his lifelong partner Javier Peña. Murphy and his wife Connie have two adopted daughters from Colombia and two biological sons.

In popular culture
His character was played by actor Boyd Holbrook in the Netflix TV series Narcos. Murphy and Peña worked as consultants on the show and made a cameo appearance in the last episode of Season 2, "Al Fin Cayó!"

He was also portrayed by Peter Sarsgaard in the movie Loving Pablo, as DEA agent Shepherd.

Books
Manhunters: How We Took Down Pablo Escobar co-written with Javier F. Peña.

External links

References

1957 births
Living people
People from Tennessee
West Virginia University alumni
Bluefield State College alumni
Drug Enforcement Administration agents
People from Princeton, West Virginia